Sandeep Singh Dhull (10 October 1988 – 6 February 2014) was an Indian cricketer who played for Haryana as well as Services. He was a right-hand wicket-keeper batsman.

In 2014, Sandeep Singh died in an accident at Mundal, his hometown.

References

External links
 
 

1988 births
2014 deaths
Indian cricketers
Services cricketers
Haryana cricketers
Cricketers from Haryana
Wicket-keepers
Accidental deaths in India